Komar, also rendered as Kuh Mar and Qamar, in Iran, may refer to:
 Komar-e Olya
 Komar-e Sofla